Camacinia is a small genus of dragonflies in the family Libellulidae. 
Species of Camacinia are found from South-east Asia to the Solomon Islands, Australia and New Guinea.
There are three species.

Species
Species of Camacinia include:

References

Libellulidae
Anisoptera genera
Odonata of Australia
Odonata of Oceania
Taxa named by William Forsell Kirby
Insects described in 1889